Albert Johnson (15 July 1920 – 22 June 2011) was a professional footballer who played as an outside right for Everton, Chesterfield and Witton Albion. He was born in Weaverham, Cheshire.

References

External links
Albert Johnson's obituary

1920 births
2011 deaths
Sportspeople from Northwich
English footballers
English Football League players
Association football wingers
Everton F.C. players
Chesterfield F.C. players
Witton Albion F.C. players